Lal Suhanra is a national park in Pakistan that is situated in the Bahawalpur district of Punjab province. It is one of South Asia's largest nationals parks, and is a UNESCO declared Biosphere Reserve. Lal Sohanra is notable for the diversity of its landscape, which includes desert, forest and wetland ecosystems.

There are archaeological remains of the ancient Indus valley civilization which once flourished along the Ghaggar-Hakra River (paleo Saraswati River).

Geography
Lal Suhanra National Park is situated some 35 kilometres east of Bahawalpur and presents a synthesis of forest and desert life. 
The park's terrain is generally flat, interspersed with sand dunes measuring between 1 and 6 meters in height and occupying as many as thousands of acres apiece.

The biosphere reserve is crossed by the dried-up bed of the Ghaggar-Hakra River and comprises Patisar Lake and irrigated land. Officials said that indigenous trees like Indian rosewood and Acacia karroo will be planted over 1,212 acres of barren land in the wildlife reserve.

Wildlife
Many species of animals can be found throughout the park. These include several wild animals of the desert such as Asiatic wildcats, rabbits, bustards, and deer. Reptiles in the park include the monitor lizard, Russell's viper, Indian cobra, saw-scaled viper, wolf snake, John's sand boa, and spiny-tailed lizard. More than 160 species of birds are also present, including the houbara bustard, griffon vulture, crested honey buzzard, marsh harrier, hen harrier, laggar falcon, peregrine falcon, kestrel, Eurasian sparrowhawk, Egyptian vulture, lark, shrike, wheatear, and barn owl. Lake Patisar, a large body of water in the center of the park, is ideal for bird watching. In mid-winter, the lake is regularly home to between 10,000 and 30,000 ducks and common coot.

Lion safari 
The Punjab government has plans to convert Lal Sohanra National Park into a wildlife safari park of international standard. One of its most prominent attractions is the lion safari, which allows guests to see lions in their natural habitat at close range.

See also
Biosphere reserves of Pakistan

References

External links

Protected areas of Punjab, Pakistan
Bahawalpur District
National parks of Pakistan
Tourist attractions in Bahawalpur